Miniomma is an extinct genus of ommatid beetle. It is known from a single species, Miniomma chenkuni, from the Cenomanian aged Burmese amber from Myanmar. The species is the smallest known ommatid, at less than 2 mm long, compared to Omma, which ranges in length from 6 to 26 mm.

References 

Burmese amber
Ommatidae
Fossil taxa described in 2020
Prehistoric beetle genera